Anne Ferris (born 24 September 1954) is an Irish Labour Party politician who served as a Teachta Dála (TD) for the Wicklow constituency from 2011 to 2016.

She was a member of Bray Town Council from 1999 to 2009 and Wicklow County Council from 2003 to 2009.

She was educated at St Agnes' Primary School in Crumlin, Dublin, and Goldenbridge Secondary School in Inchicore, Ferris holds a Diploma in Women's Studies from St Patrick's College, Maynooth.

She lost her seat at the 2016 general election She was again elected to Wicklow County Council at 2019 local elections.

References

External links
Anne Ferris's page on the Labour Party website

1954 births
Living people
Alumni of St Patrick's College, Maynooth
Labour Party (Ireland) TDs
Local councillors in County Wicklow
Members of the 31st Dáil
21st-century women Teachtaí Dála
Politicians from Dublin (city)